Cartelle is a municipality in Ourense (province) in the Galicia region of north-west Spain.

References  

Municipalities in the Province of Ourense